Mehrshani (also Romanized as Mehrshānī; also known as Mehr Shāhī) is a village in Takab-e Kuhmish Rural District, Sheshtomad District, Sabzevar County, Razavi Khorasan Province, Iran. At the 2006 census, its population was 285, in 69 families.

References 

Populated places in Sabzevar County